Jorge Sabas Victor (born 5 December 1997) also known as Victor, is a football player who currently plays as defender for Timor-Leste national football team.

International career
Victor made his senior international debut is in a 7-0 loss against Saudi Arabia national football team in the 2018 FIFA World Cup qualification on 3 September 2015.

References

External links
 

1997 births
Living people
East Timorese footballers
East Timorese expatriate footballers
Timor-Leste international footballers
Association football defenders
Footballers at the 2014 Asian Games
Association football midfielders
Footballers at the 2018 Asian Games
Competitors at the 2017 Southeast Asian Games
Asian Games competitors for East Timor
Southeast Asian Games competitors for East Timor